Hart is a surname. Notable people and characters with the surname Hart include:

A

 Aaron Hart (disambiguation), any of several people of the same name
 Abigail Hart, victim of the Hart family murders
 Alan Hart (disambiguation), any of several people of the same name
 Albert Bushnell Hart (1854–1943), American historian
Alden Hart (1860–1947), American businessman and politician
 Alfred A. Hart (1816–1908), American photographer
 Alfred S. Hart (1904–1979), American businessman and banker born as Alfred Harskovitz
 Allie Carroll Hart (1913–2003), director of the Georgia Department of Archives and History
 Alvin Youngblood Hart (born 1963), American musician
 Andro Hart (died 1621), English printer
 Angie Hart (born 1972), Australian pop singer
 Ann Weaver Hart (born 1948), Temple University president
 Armando Hart (1930–2017), Cuban politician
 Augustus L. Hart (1849–1901), California attorney general

B
 Basil Liddell Hart (1895–1970), English military historian and strategic theorist
 Benjamin Hart (disambiguation)
 Beth Hart (born 1972), American singer
 Betsy Hart (born c. 1963), American columnist and conservative commentator
 Bo Hart (born 1976), American baseball player
 Bobbi Jo Hart (born 1966), Canadian documentary filmmaker
 Bret Hart (born 1957), Canadian professional wrestler
 Brian Hart (1936–2014), British auto racer and engineer, founder of former Formula One engine manufacturer Brian Hart Ltd.
 Brooke Hart (1911–1933), kidnapping and murder victim whose murderers were killed in the last public lynching in California
 Bruce Hart (disambiguation), any of several people of the same name

C
 Carey Hart (born 1975), American motorcycle rider
 Carter Hart (born 1998), Canadian ice hockey goaltender
 Cecil Hart (1883–1940), Canadian hockey coach
 Celia Hart (1963–2008), Cuban physicist and writer
 Charles Hart (disambiguation), any of several people of the same name
 Christine Hart (born 1950), Canadian politician
 Christopher Hart (disambiguation), any of several people of the same name
 Ciera Maija Hart, victim of the Hart family murders
 Clay Hart (1936–2022), American country music singer
 Clyde Hart (born 1935), American athletic coach
 Corey Hart (singer) (born 1962), Canadian musician 
 Corey Hart (baseball) (born 1982), American baseball player 
 Creighton C. Hart (1906–1993), American philatelist

D
 D. G. Hart (born circa 1950s), American religious and social historian
 Danny Hart (footballer) (born 1989), English footballer
 Daniel Hart (disambiguation)
 David Hart (disambiguation), any of several people of the same name
 Dean Hart (1954–1990), Canadian professional wrestler
 Denis Hart (born 1941), Catholic Archbishop of Melbourne, Australia
 Devonte Jordan Hart, victim of the Hart family murders
 Diana Hart (born 1963), member of the Hart family of Canadian wrestlers
 Dolores Hart (born 1938), American actress and Catholic nun
 Doris Hart (1925–2015), American tennis player
 Dorothy Hart (1922–2004), American actress
 Doug Hart (1939–2020), American football player
 Dru Hart (born 1948), American model and Playboy Playmate

E
 Edward Hart (disambiguation), any of several people of the same name
 Edwina Hart (born 1957), British politician
 Elizabeth Hart (disambiguation), any of several people of the same name
 Emerson Hart (born 1969), American songwriter, vocalist, guitarist, and producer
 Emily Hart (born 1986), American actress
 Ephraim Hart (1747–1825), American merchant
 Ephraim Hart (NY politician) (1774–1839), American State Senator and Canal Commissioner
 Ernest Hart (disambiguation), any of several people of the same name
 Esther Hart (born 1970), Dutch singer
 Eugene Hart (born 1951), American boxer
 Eva Hart (1905–1996), British survivor of the Titanic disaster
 Evelyn Hart (born 1956), Canadian ballet dancer
 Ezekiel Hart (1770–1843), Jewish-Canadian politician
 Ezekiel B. Hart (c. 1795–1814), American naval officer

F
 Francis Dudley Hart (1909–2004), British physician
 Francis Russell Hart, after whom the Francis Russell Hart Nautical Museum is named
 Frederick Hart (disambiguation), any of several people of the same name
 Fritz Hart (1874–1949), English-born Australian composer

G
 Gaétan Hart (born 1953), Canadian boxer
 Gary Hart (disambiguation), any of several people of the same name
 Gene Hart (1931–1999), American sports announcer
 George Hart (disambiguation), any of several people of the same name
 Giles Hart (1949–2005), British engineer and trade union activist
 Gina Hart, British comics artist
 Gordon Hart, Australian rugby league footballer
 Gordon L. S. Hart (1924–2010), Canadian politician and judge
 Graeme Hart (born 1955), New Zealand businessman
 Grant Hart (1961–2017), American punk rock musician, member of Hüsker Dü

H
 H. L. A. Hart (1907–1992), British legal philosopher
 Hannah Hart (born 1986), American comedian and internet personality
 Hannah Jean Hart, victim of the Hart family murders
 Harry Hart (disambiguation)
 Harold Hart (born 1952), American football player
 Hattie Hart, American blues singer and songwriter
 Henry Hart (disambiguation)
 Hendrik Hart (fl. 20th century), philosopher
 Herbert Hart (cricketer) (1859–1895), British cricketer
 Holly Joan Hart (born 1976), Playboy playmate
 Horace Hart (1840–1916), English printer and biographer
 Horace Hart (footballer) (1894–1975), English footballer
 Howard Hart (1940–2017), American CIA officer
 Hunter Hart (1897–?), Scottish footballer

I
 Ian Hart (born 1964), English actor
 Isaiah Hart (1792–1861), American planter, founder of Jacksonville, Florida

J
 James Hart (disambiguation), any of several people of the same name
 Jane Briggs Hart (1921–2015), American aviator and activist
 Jane Hart (artist) (born 1958), American curator
 Janice Hart (born 1955), American political candidate
 Jason Hart (disambiguation), any of several people of the same name
 Jeff Hart (disambiguation), any of several people of the same name
 Jeffrey Hart (1930–2019), American cultural critic, professor emeritus of English at Dartmouth College
 Jeffrey A. Hart (born 1947), professor of Political Science at Indiana University Bloomington
 Jenifer Hart, English academic and civil servant
 Jennifer Jean "Jen" Hart, perpetrator of the Hart family murders
 Jeremiah Hart, victim of the Hart family murders
 Joe Hart (born 1987), English football goalkeeper 
 Joel Tanner Hart (1810–1877), American sculptor
 John Hart (disambiguation), any of several people of the same name
 Johnny Hart (1931–2007), American cartoonist, creator of "B.C." comic strip
Jordan Hart (born 1995), Welsh badminton player
 Joseph Hart (1712–1768), Calvinist hymn-writer
 Joseph C. Hart (1798–1855), American writer
 Joseph Hart (disambiguation)
 Josh Hart (born 1995), American basketball player
 Josh Hart (born 1983), American drag racer
 Judith Hart (1924–1991), British politician
 Judson G. Hart (1842–1913), American politician
 Julian Tudor Hart (1927–2018), British doctor and author

K
 Keith Hart (wrestler) (born 1951), Canadian professional wrestler
 Keith Hart (anthropologist), British social anthropologist, teacher at Cambridge University
 Kendall Hart, character on the soap opera All My Children
 Kevin Hart (disambiguation), several people
 Kimberly Hart, character in the Power Rangers universe
 Kimberly Hart-Simpson (born 1987), Welsh actress and businesswoman
 Kitty Carlisle Hart (1910–2007), American singer and actress
 Kyle Hart (born 1992), American professional baseball player

L
 Larry Hart (disambiguation), several people
Lawrence Hart (poet) (1901–1996), American poet
 Lenny Hart (1919–1975), American drummer
 Leslie Rupert Hart (1909–2002), South Australian sheep breeder and politician
 Leon Hart (1928–2002), American football player
 Louis F. Hart (1862–1929), governor of Washington (U.S. state)
 Lorenz Hart (1895–1943), American Broadway musical librettist
 Luke E. Hart (1880–1964), American, Supreme Knight of the Knights of Columbus

M
 Maarten 't Hart (born 1944), Dutch biologist and novelist
 Magnus Hart (born 1996), Chinese-Norwegian footballer
 Mamrie Hart (born 1983), American comedian and internet personality
 Mark Hart (born 1953), American musician
 Markis Hart, victim of the Hart family murders
 Marvin Hart (1876–1931), American boxer
 Mary Hart (disambiguation)
 Matthew Hart (born 1972), New Zealand cricketer
 Maya Hart, fictional character on Girl Meets World
 Megan Marie Hart (born 1983), American operatic soprano
 Melissa Hart (actress), American actress and singer
 Melissa Hart (politician) (born 1962), American politician
 Melissa Joan Hart (born 1976), American actress
 Merwin K. Hart (1881–1962), American lawyer, businessman, and politician
 Michael Hart (disambiguation), any of several people of the same name
 Mickey Hart (born 1943), American percussionist and musicologist
 Miranda Hart (born 1972), British actress, writer, and stand-up comic
 Missy Hart, fictional character in the movie Nine to Five
 Moss Hart (1904–1961), American playwright

N
 Nancy Hart (1735–1830), American Revolutionary figure

O
 Oliver Hart (disambiguation)
 Ossian B. Hart (1821–1874), Florida governor
 Owen Hart (1965–1999), Canadian professional wrestler

P
 Patrick H. Hart (1915–1942), US naval officer
 Patrick G. Hart (born 1965), British TV host and recording artist
 Paul Hart (born 1953), English football player and manager
 Peter Hart (disambiguation), any of several people of the same name
 Pearl Hart (1871–1956), Canadian-Ameerican cowgirl and bandit
 Penny Hart (born 1996), American football player
 Philip Hart (disambiguation), several people
 Pro Hart (1928–2006) (Kevin Charles Hart), Australian painter

R
 Sir Raymund Hart (1899–1960), British air marshal
 Reginald Clare Hart (1848–1931), British general of Irish birth
 Richard Hart (disambiguation)
 Robert Hart (disambiguation)
 Roger Hart, environmental psychology professor
 Ronald Hart (born 1961), New Zealand cricketer
 Rose Hart (born 1942), Ghanaian track and field athlete
 Roswell Hart (1824–1883), US representative from New York
 Royce Hart (born 1948), Australian football player
 Roxanne Hart (born 1952), American actress

S
 Samuel Hart (1747–1810), American merchant and politician
 Samuel Hart (clergyman) (1845–1917), American episcopal cleric and writer
 Sarah Margaret Hart (née Gengler), perpetrator of the Hart family murders
 Shaun Hart (born 1971), Australian footballer
 Sierra (legally "Ciera") Maija Hart, victim of the Hart family murders
 Smith Hart (1948–2017), Canadian wrestler
 Solomon Alexander Hart (1806–1881), British painter
 Stan Hart (1928–2017), American comedy writer
 Stanley R. Hart, American scientist (see Steinhart-Hart equation)
 Stu Hart (1915–2003), Canadian wrestler; patriarch of the Hart wrestling family
 Su Hart, British musician
 Steve Hart (1859–1880), member of the Kelly Gang

T
 Tanja Hart (born 1974), German volleyball player 
 Teddy Hart (born 1980), Canadian professional wrestler
 Terry Hart (born 1946), American astronaut
 Theodore Hart (1816–1887), Canadian businessman
 Thomas Hart (disambiguation), several people
 Tim Hart (1948–2009), English folk singer
 Tony Hart (1925–2009), British artist and television presenter
 Truman Hart (1784–1838), New York politician

V
 Veronica Hart (born 1956), American erotic actress and porn director
 Vivien Hart (1938–2009), political scientist and constitutional law expert

W
 Wes Hart (born 1977), American soccer player
 Wilbert Hart (born 1947), American soul singer, songwriter, member of The Delfonics
 William Hart (disambiguation), several people
 William S. Hart (1864–1946), American silent film actor

Deceased or presumed so

Died by 1880 
 Charles Hart (17th-century actor) (1625–1683), British actor
 John Hart (Governor of Maryland) (died 1740), governor of Maryland and the Leeward Islands
 Joseph Hart (1712–1768), British religious leader and musician
 John Hart (soldier) (1706–1777), American colonel
 John De Hart (1727–1795), American jurist & politician
 Ezekiel B. Hart (c. 1795–1814), American naval officer
 Nancy Hart (c. 1735–1830), American activist
 Ezekiel Hart (1770–1843), Canadian entrepreneur and politician
 Joseph C. Hart (1798–1855), American writer
 Isaiah Hart (1792–1861), American land entrepreneur
 John E. Hart (c. 1820–1863), American sailor
 John Hart, senior (1809–1873), Australian politician
 Ossian B. Hart (1821–1874), American politician
 Joel Tanner Hart (1810–1877), American sculptor
 John Seely Hart (1810–1877), American author and educator

Presumably died late 19th or early 20th century 
 Jim Hart (manager) (born 1855), American baseball manager
 Charles Burdett Hart (fl. c. 1900), American diplomat 
 Harry Hart (mathematician) (fl. 1875), inventor of Hart's inversors

Died 1880–1939 
 Robert Hart (politician) (1814–1894), New Zealand politician
 Ernest Abraham Hart (1835–1898), British physician & journalist
 James McDougal Hart (1828–1901), Scottish-American painter
 Augustus L. Hart (1849–1901), American jurist & politician
 Alfred A. Hart (1816–1908), American photographer
 Sir Robert Hart, 1st Baronet (1835–1911), Irish-born diplomat
 Horace Hart (1840–1916), British printer & biographer
 Charles Henry Hart (1847–1918), American author
 Charles Hart (vaudeville) (fl. c. 1910), American musician
 Reginald Clare Hart (1848–1931), Irish military officer
 Marvin Hart (1876–1931), American boxer
 Brooke Hart (1911–1933), American crime victim
 Charles H. Hart (1836–1934), American religious leader
 Charles Walter Hart (1872–1937), American tractor entrepreneur 
 Bob Hart (umpire) (1880–1937), American baseball official
 Bobby Hart (songwriter) (born 1939), American songwriter

Died 1940–1989 
 Cecil Hart (1883–1940), Canadian hockey coach
 Patrick H. Hart (1915–1942), American naval officer
 Albert Bushnell Hart (1854–1943), American historian
 Lorenz Hart (1895–1943), American lyricist
 William S. Hart (1864–1946), American silent film actor, screenwriter, director and producer
 Fritz Hart (1874–1949), English-born Australian composer
 Michael J. Hart (1877–1951), American politician from Michigan
 Richard Hart (actor) (1915–1951), American actor
 Richard Two-Gun Hart (1892–1952), a.k.a. James Vincenzo Capone, American law-enforcement officer & criminal-family member
 Ernie Hart (footballer, born 1902) (1902–1954), British footballer
 Pearl Hart (1871–1956), American bandit & journalist
 John Hart (premier) (1879–1957), Canadian politician
 Moss Hart (1904–1961), American playwright
 Luke E. Hart (1880–1964), American religious leader & activist
 Basil Liddell Hart (1895–1970), British soldier & historian
 Lenny Hart (1918/19–1974), American drummer
 Philip Hart (1912–1976), American politician
 Ernie Hart (1910–1985), American writer and artist

Died since 1990 
 Dean Hart (1954–1990), Canadian wrestler
 Judith Hart (1924–1991), British politician
 Charles E. Hart (1900–1991), American soldier
 H. L. A. Hart (1907–1992), British jurist
 Bob Hart (1900–1993), a.k.a. Al Trace,  American musician
 Gene Hart (1931–1999), American journalist
 Frederick Hart (sculptor) (1943–1999), American sculptor
 Owen Hart (1965–1999), Canadian wrestler
 Robert Hart (horticulturist) (1913–2000), British gardener
 Leon Hart (1928–2002), American football player
 Stu Hart (1915–2003), Canadian wrestler, wrestling promoter, and wrestling trainer; patriarch of the Hart wrestling family
 Dorothy Hart (1922–2004), American actress
 Giles Hart (1949–2005), British engineer and trade union activist
 Bruce Hart (songwriter) (1938–2006), American songwriter and screenwriter
 Pro Hart (1928–2006), a.k.a. Kevin Charles Hart, Australian painter
 Kitty Carlisle Hart (1910–2007), American singer and actress
 Johnny Hart (1931–2007), American cartoonist
 Gary Hart (wrestler) (1942–2008), American wrestler & manager
 Dick Hart (golfer) (1935–2013), American professional golfer
 Smith Hart (1948–2017), Canadian wrestler

Presumably died in the 20th century 
 Edward Hart (soccer) (born 1903), American player

Died in the 21st century 
All members of the family of Jennifer and Sarah Hart (themselves and adopted children Abigail, Ciera, Devonte, Hannah, Jeremaiah, and Markis) in the Hart family murders.

Living or presumed so

Decade of birth unknown 
 David Hart (American football) (fl. 1960s), American football player and coach
 Michael Hart (rower) (fl. 1970s), British rower
 Rick Hart (fl. late 20th century), Australian entrepreneur & business manager
 George A. Hart (fl. late 20th century), American physicist
 Howard Hart (fl. late 20th century), American security officer
 Hendrik Hart (fl. late 20th century), Dutch-born academic
 Julian Tudor Hart (fl. late 20th century), British physician and author
 Janice Hart (fl. 1980s), American activist
 Alan Hart (television executive) (fl. 1980s), British television executive
 Richard Hart (journalist) (fl. 1980s), American
 Bob Hart (bassist) (fl. 1990s), American
 Mike Hart (poker player) (fl. c. 1990), poker player
 Ann Weaver Hart (fl. c. 2000), American academic
 David Ananda Hart (fl. c. 2000), British religious leader
 David Bentley Hart (fl. c. 2000), American religious leader
 Gina Hart (fl. c. 2000), British comics artist
 James Hart (police commissioner) (fl. c. 2000), British
 John Hart (fl. 2000s), aka James L. Hart, American activist

Born before 1940  
 John Hart (actor) (1917–2009), American actor
 Jane Briggs Hart (1921–2015), American aviator and wife of U.S. Senator Philip Hart
 Doris Hart (1925–2015), American tennis player
 Freddie Hart (musician) (1926–2018), American musician
 Johnny Hart (English footballer) (1928–2018), British, also manager
 Armando Hart (1930–2017), Cuban politician
 Jeffrey Hart (1930–2019), American writer & academic
 John Hart (journalist) (born 1932), American journalist
 Michael H. Hart (born 1932), American physicist and author
 Valerie Hart, indigenous politician and leader of the Rupununi Uprising
 Clyde Hart (born c. 1935), American athletic coach
 Brian Hart (1936–2014), British racer, engineer, & entrepreneur
 Gary Hart (born 1936), American politician—Colorado
 Dolores Hart (born 1938), American actress & religious leader

Born 1940s 
 Denis Hart (born 1941), Australian religious leader
 Jim Ray Hart (1941–2016), American baseball player
 Clay Hart (1942–2022), American singer
 Gary K. Hart (1943–2022), American politician—California
 Keith Hart (anthropologist) (born 1943), British academic
 Mickey Hart (born 1943), American musician
 Maarten 't Hart (born 1944), Dutch biologist and novelist
 David Hart (UK political activist) (1944–2011), British writer & activist 
 Jim Hart (American football) (born 1944), American football player
 Jimmy Hart (born 1944), American wrestling business manager & musician
 Oliver Hart (born c. 1940s), British economist & academic
 Peter E. Hart (born c. 1940s), American computer scientist & entrepreneur
 George L. Hart (born c. 1945), American linguist & academic
 Michael S. Hart (1947–2011), American activist & programmer
 Dru Hart (born 1948), American model
 Royce Hart (born 1948), Australian football player
 John Hart (baseball) (born 1948), American baseball manager
 Eddie Hart (athlete) (born 1949), American athlete

Born 1950s 
 Roger Hart (born c. 1950), American psychologist & academic
 Mary Hart (TV personality) (born 1950), American journalist
 Bruce Hart (wrestler) (born 1950), Canadian wrestler
 Christine Hart (born 1950), Canadian politician
 Eugene Hart (born 1951), American boxer
 Keith Hart (wrestler) (born 1951), Canadian wrestler
Mike Hart (switch hitter) (born 1951), American baseball player
 Roxanne Hart (born 1952), American actress
 Gaétan Hart (born 1953), Canadian boxer
 Jeff Hart (American football) (born 1953), American football player
 Mark Hart (born 1953), American musician
 Paul Hart (born 1953), English football player and manager
 Kevin Hart (born 1954), Australian writer
 Richard Hart (jazz guitarist) (born 1955), American jazz guitarist, composer, arranger
 John Hart (rugby coach) (born c. 1950s), New Zealander
 Jim Hart (British Columbia politician) (born 1955), Canadian politician
 David Hart (puppeteer) (born c.1955), American actor & puppeteer
 Graeme Hart (born 1955), New Zealand business manager & entrepreneur
 David Hart (actor) (born 1954), American actor
 Evelyn Hart (born 1956), Canadian dancer
 George W. Hart (born c. 1956), American academic, programmer, & sculptor
 Michael Hart (Oxford) (born 1956), British academic
 Bret Hart (born 1957), Canadian professional wrestler
 Edwina Hart (born 1957), British politician
 Mike Hart (left-handed hitter) (born 1958), American baseball player
 Robert Hart (musician) (born 1958), American musician

Born 1960s 
 James V. Hart (born 1960), American screenwriter
 John P. Hart (born 1960), American activist
 Michael Hardt (born 1960), American critic, philosopher, & academic
 Christopher Hart (actor) (born 1961), Canadian actor
 Ronald Hart (born 1961), New Zealand cricketer
 Grant Hart (born 1961), American musician
 Charles Hart (lyricist) (born 1962), British musician
 Corey Hart (born 1962), Canadian musician
 Melissa Hart (born 1962), American politician
 Alvin Youngblood Hart (born 1963), American musician
 Diana Hart (born 1963), Canadian wrestling family member
 David Hart (footballer) (born 1964), Australian football player
 Ian Hart (born 1964), English actor
 Christopher Hart (novelist) (born 1965), British novelist
 John Hart (author) (born 1965), American novelist 
 Betsy Hart (born c. 1965), American journalist
 Richard Hart (curler) (born 1968), Canadian curler
 Emerson Hart (born 1969), American musician & producer

Born 1970s 
 Esther Hart (born 1970), Dutch singer
 Peter Hart (historian) (born c. 1970), Canadian historian
 Angie Hart (born 1972), Australian singer
 Beth Hart (born 1972), American singer
 Miranda Hart (born 1972), British actress & writer
 Matthew Hart (born 1972), New Zealand cricketer
 Robbie Hart (cricketer) (born 1974), New Zealand player
 Ben Hart (Australian footballer) (born 1974), Australian footballer
 Carey Hart (born 1975), American  driver & entrepreneur
 Bo Hart (born 1976), American baseball player
 Gary Hart (footballer) (born 1976), British footballer
 Holly Joan Hart (born 1976), American model
 Melissa Joan Hart (born 1976), American actress
 Jason Hart (basketball) (born 1978), American basketball player
 Richie Hart (born 1978), Scottish footballer
 James Stephen Hart (born 1979), American singer

Born since 1980 
 Michael Hart (footballer) (born 1980), Scottish football (soccer) player
 Corey Hart (baseball) (born 1982), American player
 John Hart (rugby union, born 1982) (born 1982), British rugby player
 Emily Hart (born 1986), American actress
 Mike Hart (American football) (born 1986), American football player
 Joe Hart (born 1987), British football player

Fictional characters
 Captain John Hart, character on Torchwood
 Jonathan and Jennifer Hart, protagonists of American TV series Hart to Hart
 Kendall Hart, on the soap opera All My Children
 Kimberly Ann "Kim" Hart, in the Power Rangers universe
 The Hart Family, central characters on Reba
 Franklin Hart, Jr and Missy Hart, characters in the film Nine to Five
 Roxie Hart, character in Chicago and stage-musical of the same name
 Harry Hart, character in Kingsman: The Secret Service and Kingsman: The Golden Circle
 Maya Hart, character on Disney Channel series Girl Meets World

See also 
 Hart family, 16th-century pirates at Wexford, Ireland (see Mary Seymour)
 Hart wrestling family
 John De Hart (1727–1795), US lawyer, jurist, statesman, Continental Congress delegate
 Francis Russell Hart Nautical Museum
 Hart (given name)
 't Hart, surname
 Harte
 Heart (disambiguation)
 Hardt (disambiguation)
 Harte (disambiguation)

German-language surnames
English-language surnames
Surnames from given names